Feio  may refer to:
 Feio River, a river of Paraná state in southern Brazil
 Moto Grosso Feio, an album by Wayne Shorter recorded on April 3, 1970
 Renato Neves Feio, a Brazilian arachnologist